Unapologetic Art Rap is the debut studio album by American hip hop artist Open Mike Eagle. It was released via Mush Records on May 11, 2010. Music videos were created for "I Rock" and "Pissy Transmissions".

Critical reception

Ali Elabbady of Potholes in My Blog gave the album 3.5 out of 5 stars, commenting that "The production is definitely a highlight" and "Mike's performance is definitely noteworthy as well." Blake Gillespie of Impose called it "the finest representations of taxonomic boom bap rap". Kevin Jones of Exclaim! said, "Quirky, laid-back, slice-of-life rhymes littered with wide-ranging pop culture references bounce from the absolutely banal to the surprisingly political, like the no day-job dreams of 'I Rock' juxtaposed with the corrosive blaxploitation denunciations heard on 'Unapologetic.'"

Track listing

References

External links
 
 

2010 debut albums
Open Mike Eagle albums
Mush Records albums
Albums produced by Exile (producer)